Friary of St Anthony, Rye was a friary in East Sussex, England.

Monasteries in East Sussex